The Michigan State University College of Human Medicine (MSUCHM) is an academic division of Michigan State University (MSU), and grants the Doctor of Medicine (MD) degree. and has a program that emphasizes patient-centered care and a biopsychosocial approach to caring for patients.  Required courses at the college reinforce the importance of ethics and professionalism in medicine.  In 2013, U.S. News & World Report ranked the college 46th for primary care. The college was also ranked for family medicine and rural medicine.  More than 4,000 M.D.s have graduated from the College. Pre-clinical campuses are located on MSU's main campus in East Lansing, Michigan and in downtown Grand Rapids, Michigan, while the clinical rotations are at seven community campuses located throughout Michigan.

History
From 1959–61, several reports demonstrated the need for a third medical school in Michigan focused on serving the state's population through direct involvement in community health care. In 1961, the Michigan State Board of Trustees decided to begin a two-year medical program at Michigan State University. Several grants aided the development of the program. Michigan State University appointed Andrew D. Hunt, MD as the first dean of the College of Human Medicine in 1964.

The College of Human Medicine began training pre-clinical medical students in the fall of 1966 (26 students) and the fall of 1967 (23 students). After their preclinical training, these students needed to transfer to other medical schools to finish the final two years of their medical school education. In 1967, the College of Human Medicine was approved for a four-year degree program. The first MDs graduated in 1972.

In 2006, Marsha D. Rappley, M.D., became the first graduate of the College of Human Medicine to become dean of the medical school. In August 2007, enrollment increased from 106 first-year students to 156 students. In October 2007, MSU Board of Trustees voted to approve a $90 million project to build a new educational facility in downtown Grand Rapids.  The construction was supported entirely with private funds, including $55 million from Spectrum Health and $5 million from Richard DeVos.  MSU alumnus and philanthropist Peter F. Secchia is the namesake for the facility, following his $10 million donation to the university.

In September 2010, the college's headquarters moved from Fee Hall in East Lansing to the newly built Secchia Center in Grand Rapids.  The college's administration maintain offices at both the East Lansing and Grand Rapids campuses.

In June 2015, MSU announced plans to build an $88 million research complex, Grand Rapids Research Center, near the Secchia Center in downtown Grand Rapids. The center opened in September 2017. In later 2015,  Marsha Rappley stepped down as Dean of the College, and Senior Associate Dean for Academic Affairs Aron Sousa, M.D., became interim dean.

On October 1, 2016, the College of Human Medicine welcomed its new dean, Norman Beauchamp Jr., MD, the second graduate of the college to serve as dean.

In October 2019, Dr. Norman Beauchamp was promoted as the Executive Vice President of Health Sciences at MSU. Dr. Aron Sousa once again reprised his role as interim dean and was appointed as dean in April 2022.

Clinical training
Clinical practice (undergraduate medical education during the third and fourth years of medical school), graduate medical education, and research takes place across eight campuses located throughout Michigan Flint, Grand Rapids, Lansing, Midland, Marquette, Southeast Michigan and Traverse City. In 2022, CHM opened a new campus in Detroit, MI with the Henry Ford Hospital main campus. The college previously had a Saginaw campus, but that was transitioned to the Central Michigan University College of Medicine in 2011. The campus in Kalamazoo, was transitioned to Western Michigan University in 2014. Students are assigned to one of the campuses for their third and fourth years, rather than a specific hospital. The campus administration then places students at hospitals within the campus. After submitting a request, clinical students are also able to take a clerkship at a campus other than their assigned campus. Students may fulfill clerkship electives outside of the MSU system only in their fourth year.

Grand Rapids

The Grand Rapids campus serves as both a pre-clinical and clinical campus.
Spectrum Butterworth Hospital
Saint Mary's Health Care
Spectrum Blodgett Hospital

Flint

The Flint campus utilizes three area hospitals.
Ascension Genesys Hospital
Hurley Medical Center
McLaren Regional Medical Center

Lansing
Adjacent to the pre-clinical campus in East Lansing, the Lansing campus provides clerkship training at area hospitals.  Pre-clinical students also have educational experiences at Sparrow Hospital.
McLaren–Greater Lansing Hospital
Sparrow Hospital

Marquette
The Upper Peninsula campus, based in Marquette, provides an environment for training physicians in rural medicine.  The campus is operated in collaboration with the Upper Peninsula Health Education Corporation.
Marquette General Hospital

Midland Regional Campus
The Midland Regional Campus is based in Midland, but students at this campus also have clerkships in hospitals in Saginaw, Alma, Clare, and Gladwin. This campus was formerly known as the Saginaw campus, but the headquarters moved to Midland as of July 2011.
MidMichigan Medical Center-Midland
MidMichigan Medical Center-Gladwin
MidMichigan Medical Center-Clare
Gratiot Medical Center
Covenant Medical Center
St. Mary's of Michigan Medical Center

Traverse City
Munson Medical Center

Southeast Michigan
Ascension Providence Southfield
Ascension Providence Novi

Graduate medical education

Residencies
The College of Human Medicine sponsors or is affiliated with 59 graduate medical education programs and 872 residents, including the following programs.  In the Lansing area, MSU collaborates with area hospitals through Graduate Medical Education, Inc.  In the Grand Rapids area, MSU programs are affiliated with the Grand Rapids Medical Education Partners.  MSU/Flint Area Medical Education partners with MSU CHM in the Flint area.

Fellowships
Affiliated fellowship programs include: 
Cardiology
Child and adolescent psychiatry
Endocrinology
Geriatrics
Hematology/oncology
Infectious disease
Interventional cardiology
Neonatology
Surgical Critical Care

Notable alumni
Mona Hanna-Attisha - pediatrician, public health advocate and Flint Water Crisis whistleblower
John A. McDougall - vegan advocate and nutrition expert
Nicholas Perricone - dermatologist and author
Stuart Sprague, nephrologist and Clinical Professor of Medicine at the Pritzker School of Medicine
Ulana Suprun - former acting Minister of Healthcare of Ukraine

References

External links

MSU College of Human Medicine residency placements

Medical schools in Michigan
Michigan State University
Educational institutions established in 1964
1964 establishments in Michigan